The Oy-Kayyng Botanical Reserve is located in Alay District of Osh Region of Kyrgyzstan. It was established in 1975 to protect the habitat of endemic Ostrowskia magnifica. The botanical reserve occupies 50 hectares.

References

Botanical reserves in Kyrgyzstan
Protected areas established in 1975